Rally Championship may refer to:

Rally Championship (series), a video game series based on Rally GB
Rally Championship (video game), a 2002 and the last video game in the series

See also
World Rally Championship